Pillaikkaga is a 1989 Indian Tamil-language action film written and directed by P. Vasu, produced by Mohan Natarajan and Tharangai V. Shanmugam under Rajakaliamman Pictures starring Prabhu, Gautami, Nassar and Rekha. The film was released on 14 April 1989.

Cast
Prabhu
Gautami
Nassar
Rekha
Rupini
Baby Dhivya Ravi
Devaraj

Soundtrack 

Soundtrack was composed by Gangai Amaran.

The song Mazhalayin and Un Annai Naan have two versions in the film which has not been included separately in the tracklist. Other version of song "Un Annai" was sung by the film's director P. Vasu.

Release & reception
Pillakkaga was released on 14 April 1989, Puthandu. The Indian Express wrote "Imposing angles and neat and tangy cutting building up much interest and tension initially but it is overdose of sentiment that director P. Vasu plumps for in an attempt to woo women to his film." Despite facing competition from other Puthandu releases such as Apoorva Sagodharargal, Pudhea Paadhai and En Rathathin Rathame, the film was declared a Hit at the box office.
 It was dubbed into Telugu as Police Tiger.

References

1989 films
Indian action drama films
Films directed by P. Vasu
1980s Tamil-language films
1980s action drama films